K.V.S. was a small manufacturing company based in Lyon-Chassieu, France, which manufactured a range of microcars. KVS, previously 'Les Equipements Electriques K.V.' had their origins within 'SA Fabrique Lyonnaise de Motocyclettes New-Map et Motosacoche', producers of the New-Map motorcycle range and originators of the Rolux and Solyto microcars. New-Map were suppliers of metal fabrications to KV whose primary business was in the manufacture of telephone equipment. When the Director of New-Map retired, KV took over the company and continued production of the Solyto until 1974. KV became KVS in 1978 after the company was again resold with the production of microcars as its main aim. 
Microcar production ceased in 1985.

References

External links 
Gazoline: French language magazine article tracing the history of the New-Map, KV and KVS hierarchy.
3-wheelers.com A restored 1982 KVS Mini 1 in The Bruce Weiner Microcar Museum
Autoblog: An article about a surviving KV Mini 1.

See also 
List of microcars by country of origin

Microcars
Defunct motor vehicle manufacturers of France